The Norodom Ranariddh Party (NRP) was a Cambodian political party created by Prince Norodom Ranariddh, who left the royalist FUNCINPEC party of which he was previously President.

A congress of people chose to change the name of their political party called Khmer National Front Party to the Norodom Ranariddh Party on 16 November 2006 and elected Prince Norodom Ranariddh as the president of NRP.

It was briefly known as the Nationalist Party from 2008 to 2010.

Political ideology

The party promotes several ideologies. On the conservative side, it promotes the preservation of Cambodia's "cultural landmarks" while improving the capital city "Phnom Penh's master plan" to mend "buildings in the city in order to" be an excellent "modern city." The party also wants to keep the existence of the "Khmer race and its culture, religion and language." The NRP wants to nationally stop the "increase in the price of goods" and will get rid of "the monopoly on foreign good imports" and take away "tariffs on" the necessary foods Cambodia gets from other countries.

On the progressive side, it believes in making the "minimum wages for factory workers" larger. The NRP would oppose the "blocks of flats which have been constructed to poor technical standards" particularly those with no necessary emergency systems. A liberal part of this party's ideology is promoting freedom from the rulers of Cambodia who only think of "power, money and themselves" or a "dictatorial" and militaristic government. Apart from that, the party proposed reforming the "city's judicial systems", freeing it from any damaging misguidance so it can give its "independence and fairness for the people."

Political activities
The Norodom Ranariddh Party created an alliance with three political parties: the Sam Rainsy Party, FUNCINPEC party and the Human Rights Party. Together they wanted the international community and Cambodia to oppose the Cambodian elections that were "won" on 27 July 2008 by the Cambodian People's Party because the CPP "manipulated and rigged" the elections.

Prince Norodom Ranariddh announced "retirement from politics" on Friday 3 October 2008. However he still will have influence on "NRP policy". While that's happening the party appointed Chhim Siek Leng "as its next [acting] leader."

Norodom Ranariddh entered politics again on 11 December 2010, when the NRP (which had been known as the Nationalist Party after Norodom Ranariddh left) renamed itself again.

Election results

General election

Communal elections

References

External links
NRP website

2006 establishments in Cambodia
Buddhist political parties
Cambodian democracy movements
Nationalist parties in Cambodia
Political parties established in 2006
Political parties in Cambodia
2014 disestablishments in Cambodia
Political parties disestablished in 2014